This is a list of members of the Northern Territory Legislative Assembly from 1994 to 1997.

 Fannie Bay CLP MLA Marshall Perron resigned on 29 May 1995. ALP candidate Clare Martin won the resulting by-election on 17 June.
 Arnhem ALP MLA Wes Lanhupuy resigned on 25 August 1995. ALP candidate Jack Ah Kit won the resulting by-election on 7 October.
 Stuart ALP MLA Brian Ede resigned on 23 August 1996. ALP candidate Peter Toyne won the resulting by-election on 28 September.

See also

1994 Northern Territory general election

Members of Northern Territory parliaments by term
20th-century Australian politicians